Jonathan Butterworth  may refer to:

 Jon Butterworth, physicist at UCL
 Jon-Allan Butterworth, cyclist born 1966

See also
 John Butterworth (disambiguation)